Henry Gray  (1827 – 13 June 1861) was a British anatomist and surgeon most notable for publishing the book Gray's Anatomy.  He was elected a Fellow of the Royal Society (FRS) at the age of 25.

Biography
Gray was born in Belgravia, London, in 1827 and lived most of his life in London. In 1842, he entered as a student at St. George's Hospital, London (then situated in Belgravia, now moved to Tooting), and he is described by those who knew him as a most painstaking and methodical worker, and one who learned his anatomy by the slow but invaluable method of making dissections for himself.

While still a student, Gray secured the triennial prize of Royal College of Surgeons in 1848 for an essay entitled The Origin, Connexions and Distribution of nerves to the human eye and its appendages, illustrated by comparative dissections of the eye in other vertebrate animals. In 1852, at the early age of 25, he was elected a Fellow of the Royal Society, and in the following year he obtained the Astley Cooper prize of three hundred guineas for a dissertation "On the structure and Use of Spleen."

In 1858, Gray published the first edition of Anatomy, which covered 750 pages and contained 363 figures. He had the good fortune of securing the help of his friend Henry Vandyke Carter, a skilled draughtsman and formerly a demonstrator of anatomy at St. George's Hospital. Carter made the drawings from which the engravings were executed. The excellence of Carter's illustrations contributed greatly to the initial success of the book.  This edition was dedicated to Sir Benjamin Collins Brodie. A second edition was prepared by Gray and published in 1860.  The book is still published under the title Gray's Anatomy and widely appreciated as an authoritative textbook for medical students.

Gray held successively the posts of demonstrator of Anatomy, curator of the museum and Lecturer of Anatomy at St. George's Hospital and was in 1861 a candidate for the post of assistant surgeon.

Death
Gray was struck by an attack of confluent smallpox, the most deadly type of the disease where individual lesions become so numerous that they join as a continuous, "confluent" sheet. He is assumed to have been infected due to his extended and meticulous caring for his ten-year-old nephew, Charles Gray, who did eventually recover. On 13 June 1861, the day he was to appear for an interview as a final candidate for a prestigious post at the St. George's Hospital, he died at the age of 34. He was buried at Highgate Cemetery. Gray had been vaccinated against smallpox as a child with one of the early forms of the vaccine.

Works/Bibliography
The Origin, Connections, and Distribution of Nerves to the Human Eye and its Appendages, illustrated by Comparative Dissections of the Eye in Other Vertebrate Animals (1848) - essay
On the Structure and Use of Spleen (1854) - jointly illustrated by Henry Vandyke Carter
Descriptive and Surgical Anatomy 1st Edition (August 1858) - jointly illustrated by Henry Vandyke Carter - popularly known as Gray's Anatomy
Descriptive and Surgical Anatomy 2nd Edition (December 1860) - jointly illustrated by Henry Vandyke Carter and John Gulse Westmacott - popularly known as Gray's Anatomy
(please help list more editions!)

References

Some information was extracted from an article which appeared in the St. George's Hospital Gazette of 21 May 1908 and has been taken directly from Gray's Anatomy-Thirty-seventh International Student Edition.

External links
 On the Structure and Use of the Spleen (1854) and Descriptive and Surgical Anatomy, 1st and 2nd editions (1858 and 1860)
 Gray's Anatomy, 20th edition (1918)
 First American edition of Gray's Anatomy (Philadelphia, 1859)
 
 

1827 births
1861 deaths
19th-century English medical doctors
Alumni of St George's, University of London
British textbook writers
Burials at Highgate Cemetery
Deaths from smallpox
English anatomists
English surgeons
Fellows of the Royal Society
Infectious disease deaths in England
Medical school textbook writers
People from Belgravia